Reach Out is a 1999 Japanese language album by South Korean girl group S.E.S., released under VAP. It was the group's first Japanese album and spawned three promotional singles.

Background and promotion

"めぐりあう世界" (Meguriau Sekai) was the first single from the album and the group's first Japanese single overall.  It was released October 28, 1998, and sold approximately 14,000 copies, peaking at number 37 on the Oricon Singles Chart.  The single's B-sides were "Believe in Love" and an instrumental version of the title track.

Another single, officially called the "1.5" single, was released on December 10, 1998.  It sold approximately 2,000 copies and contained the "Miami DJ Remix" of "Meguriau Sekai" and the "Jon Robinson Groove Mix" of "Believe in Love".  Also included were remixes of two of S.E.S.' Korean songs, "I'm Your Girl (Kreva Mix)" and "Oh, My Love (Cyber Soul Mix)", the original versions of which were both on S.E.S.' first Korean album, I'm Your Girl (album).

The official second single, "夢をかさねて" (Yume wo Kasanete), was released on February 21, 1999. It sold approximately 5,000 copies. Its B-sides were "Little Bird" and an instrumental version of the title track.

Track listing

References

External links 
  S.E.S.' Official Site

1999 albums
S.E.S. (group) albums